Being part of the Kingdom of Denmark, the foreign relations of Faroe Islands are handled in cooperation with the Danish government and Government of Faroe Islands.

Unlike Denmark, Faroe Islands is not a part of the European Union, and Danish citizens who are residents of the islands are not citizens of the EU.

General relations 
The Constitution of Denmark states that the Danish government handles in principle all foreign and security relations for the Kingdom. However, the Foreign Policy Act of 2005 allows the Islands to make agreements when they relate solely to matters within the powers of the Islands' government. The High Commission of Denmark in the Faroe Islands represents the Danish government on the Islands. The current Foreign Minister is Jenis av Rana.

Diplomatic missions 

 Brussels
 Copenhagen
 London
 Moscow
 Tel Aviv
 Reykjavik

Membership in international organisations 

 Baltic Sea Parliamentary Conference
 Food and Agriculture Organization (associate member)
 International Maritime Organization (associate member)
 North Atlantic Marine Mammal Commission
 UNESCO (associate member)
 West Nordic Council

Treaties 

 Free trade agreements with Norway, Switzerland and Turkey
 Fisheries agreements with Greenland, Iceland, Norway and Russia
 Hoyvík Agreement, guaranteeing full freedom of movement for goods, services, capital and people between the Faroes and Iceland.

EU relations 

As explicitly asserted by both Rome treaties, the Faroe Islands are not part of the European Union. This means that the free movement of goods, people, capital and services and other directives by the EU do not apply between it and the Faroe Islands.

A protocol to the treaty of accession of Denmark to the European Communities stipulates that Danish nationals residing in the Faroe Islands are not to be considered as Danish nationals within the meaning of the treaties. Hence, Danish people living in the Faroes are not citizens of the European Union (other EU nationals living there remain EU citizens).

The Faroe Islands are not part of the Schengen Area. However, persons travelling between the Faroe Islands and the Schengen Area are not subject to border controls, although there may be identity checks when checking in for flights.

Charges for international services such as phone roaming and bank transfers are much higher than inside the EU.

EU boycott against the Faroe Islands 
In July 2013 EU imposed sanctions on the Faroe Islands due to a dispute over the fishing quota of herring and mackerel. The boycott, which started on 28 August 2013, banned Faroese vessels carrying herring or mackerel from all EU ports, including Denmark, Sweden and Finland. The Faroe Islands could no longer export herring or mackerel to EU countries. The boycott was lifted on 20 August 2014 after a breakthrough in negotiations which saw the Faroese share of the total mackerel quota jump from 4.62% to 12.6%.

Russia relations 
The Islands reached a fisheries agreement with the Soviet Union in the 1970s (one of the first western countries to do so during the Cold War), and Russia has remained a major export market in the post-Soviet era. The tensions between the EU and Russia following the Russo-Ukrainian War did not affect this trade. In 2015 the Islands opened a diplomatic mission in Moscow, and signed a memorandum of cooperation with the Eurasian Economic Union in 2018. In 2022, the Faroese PM Bárður á Steig Nielsen condemned the 2022 Russian invasion of Ukraine.

US relations 
The Foreign Minister Jenis av Rana met US Secretary of State Mike Pompeo in Copenhagen on July 22, 2020. On November 28th, the Islands signed a partnership declaration with the United States. The US ambassador to Denmark Carla Sands had previously exerted pressure on the Islands not to let Huawei supply its 5G network infrastructure. In October, the Commander of United States Naval Forces Europe-Africa, Robert P. Burke, had also met with the Foreign Minister.

See also 

 Faroese independence movement
Politics of the Faroe Islands

References 

Government of the Faroe Islands